Roddy McMillan OBE (23 March 1923 – 9 July 1979) was a Scottish actor and playwright, possibly most famous for his comedy role as Para Handy for BBC Scotland's television series, The Vital Spark. He also played the lead role in Edward Boyd's private eye series, The View from Daniel Pike.

Biography

The Glasgow-born McMillan worked for a time in a glassworks.  His theatre work began in the mid-1940s with the Glasgow Unity Theatre. Later that decade, he began acting with the Glasgow Citizen's Company before moving on to Edinburgh's Gateway Theatre in the mid-1950s.

His first play, All in Good Faith, about a Glasgow family which unexpectedly comes into possession of £15,000, was first staged in 1954. He performed in his second play, The Bevellers, which premiered at the Lyceum Theatre in Edinburgh and achieved success at the Citizens Theatre in Glasgow during 1973 and then as a televised Play for Today for the BBC. McMillan also played Detective Inspector "Choc" Minty in the late 1970s private eye series, Hazell, starring Nicholas Ball.

McMillan was awarded the OBE in the 1978 Queen's Birthday honours.

Death 
Roddy McMillan died following a heart attack, aged 56, not long after completing filming on the second series of Hazell.

Filmography

Reviews
 Findlay, Bill (1980), review of All in Good Faith in Bold, Christine (ed.), Cencrastus No. 3, Summer 1980, pp. 43 & 44, .

References

External links 
 
 
 

Male actors from Glasgow
Scottish male stage actors
Scottish male television actors
Scottish dramatists and playwrights
1923 births
1979 deaths
People from Anderston
20th-century Scottish male actors
20th-century British dramatists and playwrights